Brillantaisia is a genus of plants in the family Acanthaceae. They are native to the African tropics and subtropics, including Madagascar. They may grow from 20 cm to 2 m in height. Their hirsute stems are square in cross-section and their heart-shaped leaves have an opposite arrangement. Their purple or white pea-like flowers produce long, cigar-shaped seed pods. They reproduce easily from seeds or vegetatively. One species, B. lamium, is invasive in Queensland.

Species
It contains some 17 species,  including:
 Brillantaisia borellii Lindau
 Brillantaisia cicatricosa Lindau
 Brillantaisia debilis Burkill
 Brillantaisia didynama Lindau
 Brillantaisia fulva Lindau
 Brillantaisia grandidentata S.Moore
 Brillantaisia lamium Benth.
 Brillantaisia lancifolia Lindau
 Brillantaisia madagascariensis T.Anderson ex Lindau
 Brillantaisia majestica Wernham
 Brillantaisia oligantha Milne-Redh.
 Brillantaisia owariensis P.Beauv.
 Brillantaisia pubescens T. Anderson ex Oliv.
 Brillantaisia richardsiae Vollesen
 Brillantaisia riparia (Vollesen & Brummitt) Sidwell
 Brillantaisia stenopteris Sidwell
 Brillantaisia ulugurica Lindau
 Brillantaisia vogeliana Benth.

References

Acanthaceae
Acanthaceae genera
Taxonomy articles created by Polbot